The second season of the television series HaShminiya was originally broadcast on Arutz HaYeladim (HOT) in Israel.

Season overview
The second season opens in an illustrious law office of Dedi and Avner, in guilt that they used the kids in illegal ways. They are going to lose it, but the testimony of Yair Noam, the prime minister (that was the head of the project as the education minister) prevents it. In the continuation, Dedi, Dganit and Avner starts a new project, with the country's confirmation this time. They are getting an elaborate watch-tower in the top of the Azrieli towers; there they can work easily. The ostensible reason is solving some of the country issues, but in fact, the country is trying to use their lambda. The project is well funded by the Prime Minister and his assistant, Muli Noam.

Nini decides to be 15 again, and Aya is visiting Lillie in jail and even to Patmos, her asylum. The plane Aya boarded to Patmos crashed on the sea. It was assumed Aya died in the crash, although no corpse was found. At the same time, Dganit meets an orphaned girl named Nitzan and adopts her to her house. Nitzan sleeps in Aya's room and starts to spend time with the group. At first, she's dating Dori, but finally she's dating Adam, after he reconciles himself with Aya's death. Avner recognizes lambda ripples in Nitzan too and she joins the project, instead of Aya. At the same time, it is seen that Aya is not dead, but in an isolated desert in the middle of nowhere.

Aya confronts the snatcher who is Muli Noam, disguising himself with a purple Pikachu mask. Muli is a member of a sect named "Scorpio", a destructive sect that wants to spread their ideas using the lambda ripples and wants to dominate the world. The sect is trying to pump Aya's energy and even threatens to hurt Adam's sister, Rotem. Later, they kidnap Dedi. At the same time, Daniel Harris, a 19-year-old millionaire, is getting into Natascha and Roni's life. He's dating Roni and taking Natascha as a beginner artist under his patronage. But, he is a member of the Scorpio sect too. And as he is, Lina, Natascha's cousin, does too. Nearly at the end of the season, it is revealed that Lillie was a member of the sect also; she saved her ex-husband and daughter, Dedi and Aya, but she is going to jail, again.

The sect members kidnap the octette and bring them into the temple where Aya, Dedi and Lillie are. Finally, Dedi shoots Muli and all the sect members are halted by the police, except Daniel, who escapes. The octette members, and especially Adam, are shocked to see Aya alive. Aya is coming back home, but she is broken-hearted and feels hard and uncomfortable with her friends. Nitzan is moving to Roni's place, instead of Roni's sister, Elli, who is flying to London as a MTV emissary. Dganit tells Dedi that she is pregnant, and they are getting married.

Episodes

{| class="wikitable plainrowheaders" style="width:100%; margin:auto; background:#FFFFFF;"
|-
! style="background-color: #006400; color:#FFF; text-align: center;" width="35"|Series# 
!! style="background-color: #006400; color:#FFF; text-align: center;" width="35"|Season# 
!! style="background-color: #006400; color:#FFF; text-align: center;"|Title
!! style="background-color: #006400; color:#FFF; text-align: center;" width="140"|Original airdate

|}

2006 Israeli television seasons